Syrian Crisis may refer to:

 Levant Crisis of 1945
 Syrian Crisis of 1957
 Syrian Civil War (2011 – present)
 Syrian Crisis Cell, a security committee established by the Syrian government to coordinate the response to the Syrian Civil War